Khuda Aur Muhabbat (Urdu: خدا اور محبت‎ — English: God and Love) was the first season of Khuda Aur Mohabbat series that aired on Geo Entertainment. It is based on the novel of the same name written by Hashim Nadeem. Imran Abbas Naqvi and Sadia Khan are featured as the lead role in the first season. The lyrics of serial's title song 'Karun Sajda Aik Khuda Ko' were penned by producer Javeria Saud.

Plot 
Khuda Aur Mohabbat was based on a classic love story of two star-struck lovers as they struggle to fight for their love. Hammad belongs to an elite family and has recently completed his Bachelor's in Commerce. Hammad's strange encounter with Imaan, the daughter of Moulvi Aleemuddin, brings an immense change in his life. Hammad's love at first sight with Imaan forces him to leave his family and his lavish lifestyle as he struggles to be accepted by Imaan's family. After leaving his house, Hammad takes a job at a porter which requires hard labour. In the quest to be suitable for Imaan, Hammad finds spirituality and the true meaning of religion along the way. Despite of Hammad's efforts, Moulvi Aleem refuses to understand the idea of love marriage and is unable to forgive Hammad for being in love with Imaan. Due to family pressure, Imaan is forced to marry her cousin Abdullah and begs Hammad to return to his own family. Hammad unable to subside his affection for Imaan is adamant on marrying her. Under nerve-racking circumstances and constant tribulations, Imaan falls ill and Hammad is left to fight alone for their love.

Cast

Sequel 
In 2016, Geo Entertainment released the season 2 of Khuda Aur Mohabbat.

References 

Khuda Aur Muhabbat
2011 Pakistani television seasons